Wushu was contested by both men and women at the 2013 East Asian Games in taolu and sanshou disciplines from 6–8 December 2013.

Medalists 
Only the results from the taolu events have been preserved.

Men

Women

Medal table 
Taolu only.

References 

Wushu at the East Asian Games
2013 East Asian Games
2013 in wushu (sport)
Wushu competitions in China